Year 1465 (MCDLXV) was a common year starting on Tuesday (link will display the full calendar) of the Julian calendar.

Events 
 January–December 
 January 24 – Chilia is conquered by Stephen the Great of Moldavia, following a second siege. 
 January 29 – Amadeus IX becomes Duke of Savoy.
 January 30 – Charles VIII of Sweden is deposed. Clergyman Kettil Karlsson Vasa becomes Regent of Sweden.
 c. March – Queens' College, Cambridge, is refounded by Elizabeth Woodville.
 July 16 – Battle of Montlhéry: Troops of King Louis XI of France fight inconclusively against an army of great nobles, organized as the League of the Public Weal.
 July 18 – Former King Henry VI of England is captured by Yorkist forces. On July 24 he is imprisoned in the Tower of London. His queen consort Margaret of Anjou and Edward of Westminster, Prince of Wales, have fled to France.
 August 11 – In Sweden, Regent Kettil Karlsson Vasa, Bishop of Linköping, is succeeded as Regent by Archbishop Jöns Bengtsson Oxenstierna.

 Date unknown 
 The Moroccan Revolt in Fez ousts the Maranid rulers, and leads to the killing of many Jews.
 Massive flooding in central and southern China motivates the initial construction of hundreds of new bridges.
 The main altar of St Martin's Church, Colmar is finished by painter Caspar Isenmann.

Births 
 January 1 – Lachlan Cattanach Maclean, 11th Chief, Scottish clan chief (d. 1523)
 February 4 – Frans van Brederode, Dutch rebel (d. 1490)
 February 6 – Scipione del Ferro, Italian mathematician (d. 1526)
 March 16 – Kunigunde of Austria, Archduchess of Austria (d. 1520)
 June 10 – Mercurino Gattinara, Italian statesman and jurist (d. 1530)
 June 24 – Isabella del Balzo, queen consort of Naples (d. 1533)
 July 29 – Ichijō Fuyuyoshi, Japanese court noble (d. 1514)
 August 17 – Philibert I, Duke of Savoy (d. 1482)
 September 11 – Bernardo Accolti, Italian poet (d. 1536)
 October 14 – Konrad Peutinger, German humanist and antiquarian (d. 1547)
 December 11 – Ashikaga Yoshihisa, Japanese shōgun (d. 1489)
 date unknown
 Şehzade Ahmet, oldest son of Sultan Bayezid II (d. 1513)
 Hector Boece, Scottish historian (d. 1536)
 William Cornysh, English composer (d. 1523)
 Diego Velázquez de Cuéllar, Spanish conquistador (d. 1524)
 probable
 Gil Vicente, Portuguese poet and playwright
 Francisco Álvares, Portuguese missionary and explorer (d. 1541))
 Mette Dyre, Danish noblewoman, nominal sheriff and chancellor
 Johann Tetzel, German Dominican priest (d. 1519)

Deaths 
 January 5 – Charles, Duke of Orléans, French poet (b. 1394)
 January 14 – Thomas Beckington, English statesman and prelate
 January 29 – Louis, Duke of Savoy (b. 1413)
 March 30 – Isabella of Clermont, queen consort of Naples (b. c. 1424)
 April 30 – Jacob of Juterbogk, German theologian (b. c. 1381)
 May 12 – Thomas Palaiologos, claimant to Byzantine throne (b. 1409)
 August 11 – Kettil Karlsson, regent of Sweden and Bishop of Linköping (plague; b. 1433)
 August 14 – Abd al-Haqq II, last Marinid Sultan of Morocco (b.1419)
 September 25 – Isabella of Bourbon, countess consort of Charolais, spouse of Charles the Bold (b. c. 1434)
 November 20 – Malatesta Novello, Italian condottiero (b. 1418)
 date unknown – John Hardyng, English chronicler (b. 1378)

References